Coleotechnites ardas is a moth of the family Gelechiidae. It is found in North America, where it has been recorded from Saskatchewan.

The larvae feed on Pinus contorta.

References

Moths described in 1961
Coleotechnites